Christine Nestler (born 27 September 1940) is a German cross-country skier. She competed at the 1964 Winter Olympics and the 1968 Winter Olympics.

Cross-country skiing results

Olympic Games

World Championships

References

External links
 

1940 births
Living people
German female cross-country skiers
Olympic cross-country skiers of the United Team of Germany
Olympic cross-country skiers of East Germany
Cross-country skiers at the 1964 Winter Olympics
Cross-country skiers at the 1968 Winter Olympics
Sportspeople from Saxony